Detlef Schmidt (born 24 February 1958) is a West German sprint canoer who competed in the mid to late 1980s. He won a silver medal in the K-4 500 m event at the 1986 ICF Canoe Sprint World Championships in Montreal.

Schmidt also finished eighth in the K-4 1000 m event at the 1984 Summer Olympics in Los Angeles.

References

Sports-reference.com profile

1958 births
Canoeists at the 1984 Summer Olympics
German male canoeists
Living people
Olympic canoeists of West Germany
ICF Canoe Sprint World Championships medalists in kayak